Asia Song Festival,  A-Song-Fe or ASF, is an annual Asian pop music festival held in South Korea, since 2004. It is hosted by Korea Foundation for International Culture Exchange (KOFICE) and features artists from Asian countries. Participating artists are awarded a plaque of appreciation by the Korean Ministry of Culture, Sports and Tourism and Best Asian Artist by the chairman of Korea Foundation for International Culture and Exchange (KOFICE). South Korean boy band TVXQ is the only act to have participated for five consecutive years, since the 1st festival in 2004.

This festival is recorded and broadcast on Seoul Broadcasting System in Korea and Fuji TV in Japan; and other major broadcasting stations around the world including United States, China, Hong Kong, Taiwan, Thailand, Malaysia, Indonesia, Brunei, the Philippines, Finland, Bulgaria, Vietnam and Singapore.

The theme song for the 2011 Festival "Dreams Come True", a duet by Lee Donghae of Super Junior and Seohyun of Girls' Generation was released on 11 October 2011 as a digital single. The proceeds from the sale were donated to Unicef to help children in African countries.

History

Awards

Participating countries

See also

List of music festivals in South Korea
 K-pop
 J-pop
 C-pop
 Mandopop 
 Cantopop
 Hokkien pop
 V-pop
 Thai pop
 Pinoy pop
 Malaysian pop
 Indo pop

References

External links
 Asia Song Festival official site  (in Korean)

Music festivals established in 2004
Pop music festivals in South Korea
South Korean music awards
K-pop festivals
Annual events in South Korea
Autumn events in South Korea